Michael Ande (born 5 October 1944, Bad Wiessee) is a German actor, best-known for his role as Gerd Heymann in the West German crime-drama television series The Old Fox which he played between 1977 and 2016.

He was a well-known German film child star during the 1950s.  A German reader reports, "Michael played in mostly melodramas--those films with nice people, love and mountains, etc (sentimental film in an idealized setting). Some would consider these rather schmaltz tear-jerkers. Two words come to mind in German. The first is "Heimatfilm". Heimat is home, where I came from This kind of film stands for: very sentimental, lots of love (and some ache but with Happy End), idealistic setting, Lederhosen, Mountains, Conservative ideals, etc. The second is "Heile-Welt-Film" meaning "intact-world-film" They were, however very popular films in Germany."

He played a variety of roles in these films, including choir boys. One of these films was Der schönste Tag meines Lebens (1957) in which he played a chorister in the Vienna Boys' Choir. There is an image of him, for example, on the HBC choir-film pages. Michael also played in two German films about the Trapp family: The Trapp Family (1956) and The Trapp Family in America (1958). These films were made some years before the 1965 U.S. film musical version of the Trapp films, The Sound of Music, was made. (The Broadway version appeared in 1959.) Michael played the role of Werner in the Trapp-films. (In The Sound of Music the boy's name is Kurt.) Ande like many child actors had difficulty continuing his career as an adult actor. He had problems being accepted as adult actor as he had such a youthful-looking face.

Much attention he found in the role of Jim Hawkins on Television in Treasure Island, based on the novel by Robert Louis Stevenson, which was broadcast on Christmas 1966 for the first time.

Ande is still acting and occasionally appears on German television.

Selected filmography 

 Marianne of My Youth (1955) - Klein-Felix
 I Know What I'm Living For (1955) - Pit
 Reaching for the Stars (1955) - Peppino
 Holiday in Tyrol (1956) - Rosmarin von Stetten / Thymian Retzer
 Die Stimme der Sehnsucht (1956) - Ein Fischerjunge
 The Trapp Family (1956) - Werner von Trapp
 Das Hirtenlied vom Kaisertal (1956) - Hansl, Hüterbub
 Die Prinzessin von St. Wolfgang (1957) - Franzl, Josis Bruder
 Der schönste Tag meines Lebens (1957) - Toni
 Scandal in Bad Ischl (1957) - Prinz Franz
  (1957) - Ibrahim als Kind
 The Doctor of Stalingrad (1958) - Sergej, Worotilows Sohn
 The Trapp Family in America (1958) - Werner von Trapp
 Don Vesuvio und das Haus der Strolche (1958)
 Majestät auf Abwegen (1958) - Maximilian III
 When the Bells Sound Clearly (1959) - Michael
  (1962, TV Movie) - Dick Tipton
 Peter Pan (1962, TV Movie)
 Die Grotte (1963, TV Movie) - Alexis - Küchenjunge
 Condemned to Sin (1964) - Albert, Starostas Sohn
 Hava, der Igel (1966, TV Movie) - Mendel Mandelblüth
 Die Schatzinsel (Treasure Island) (1966-1967, TV Mini-Series) - Jim Hawkins
 Der Paradiesgarten (1970)
 Der schwarze Graf (1970, TV Series) - Jonathan
 Das provisorische Leben (1971, TV Movie) - Andreas Ott
 Die Utopie des Damenschneiders Wilhelm Weitling (1971)
 Fuchs und Co (1972, TV Series) - Richard Fuchs
 Fußballtrainer Wulff (1972-1973, TV Series) - Heinz Kudrowski
 Scheibenschießen (1973, TV Movie) - Bert
 Die Powenzbande (1974, TV Mini-Series) - Kaspar Powenz
 Derrick (1975-1198, TV Series) - Gerd Heymann / Heinz Lissner / Richard Kern
 Der Alte (1977-2016, TV Series, 401 episodes) - Polizeiinspektor Gerd Heymann
 Polizeiinspektion 1 (1981–1986, TV Series)
 Liebe Melanie (1983, TV Movie) - Martin Reich
 Eichbergers besondere Fälle (1987), TV
 Zur Freiheit (1988, TV Series) - Penner
 Café Meineid - Herzliches Beileid (1994)
 Zurück auf Los! (2000) - Pkw-Fahrer

External links 
 
 Alexander Agency Munich 

1944 births
German male film actors
German male child actors
German male television actors
Living people
20th-century German male actors
21st-century German male actors